Float is the second studio album by American hip hop artist Aesop Rock. It was released on Mush Records on September 5, 2000. Produced by Aesop Rock himself, Blockhead, and Omega One, it features guest appearances from Slug, Vast Aire, and Doseone.

Critical reception

Brad Mills of AllMusic gave the album 4 stars out of 5, calling it "surprising, analytical, darkness, mystery, lyricism, and jealous." Jon Caramanica of Spin gave the album a 7 out of 10, commenting that "Aesop's voice is a rich, flat bass cut with a thin growl; through its resonance, he's able to explore the variations within a timbre to access a vast emotional range." Thomas Quinlan of Exclaim! gave the album a mixed review, writing: "While there are no bad songs, the consistent similarity between all of the tracks in regards to drum samples and vocal sounds causes the album to have a bit of a tiresome feel as it nears its conclusion." He added: "The guest MCs add different vocal styles to the album, which helps take your mind off Aesop's vocals long enough to appreciate them when they come back."

In 2014, Joseph Schafer of Stereogum named it the 3rd best Aesop Rock record, saying: "The whole record sounds more anxious than his more assured later work, which makes for an exciting listen."

Track listing

Personnel
Credits adapted from liner notes.

 Aesop Rock – vocals, production (1, 3, 4, 8, 11, 15, 16, 20)
 Blockhead – production (2, 5–7, 9, 12–14, 17–19)
 Omega One – production (10)
 Slug – vocals (5)
 Vast Aire – vocals (14)
 Doseone – vocals (18)

References

External links
 

2000 albums
Aesop Rock albums
Mush Records albums
Albums produced by Aesop Rock
Albums produced by Blockhead (music producer)